Kainandro da Silva Pereira Santos (born 4 June 2000), commonly known as Kainandro, is a Brazilian footballer who plays for Lagos.

Career statistics

Club

Notes

References

2000 births
Living people
Brazilian footballers
Brazilian expatriate footballers
Association football defenders
Campeonato Brasileiro Série C players
UAE Pro League players
UAE First Division League players
Campeonato de Portugal (league) players
Grêmio Foot-Ball Porto Alegrense players
CR Vasco da Gama players
Al-Ittihad Kalba SC players
Al Urooba Club players
Clube Atlético Mineiro players
Floresta Esporte Clube players
Expatriate footballers in the United Arab Emirates
Expatriate footballers in Portugal
Brazilian expatriate sportspeople in the United Arab Emirates
Brazilian expatriate sportspeople in Portugal